An enumerator is a Turing machine with an attached printer. The Turing machine can use that printer as an output device to print strings. Every time the Turing machine wants to add a string to the list, it sends the string to the printer. Enumerator is a type of Turing machine variant and is equivalent with Turing machine.

Formal definition

Initially,  receives no input, and all the tapes are blank (i.e., filled with blank symbols).

Equivalence of Enumerator and Turing Machines
A language over a finite alphabet is Turing Recognizable if and only if it can be enumerated by an enumerator. This shows Turing recognizable languages are also recursively enumerable. 

Proof

A Turing Recognizable language can be Enumerated by an Enumerator

Consider a Turing Machine  and the language accepted by it be . Since the set of all possible strings over the input alphabet  i.e. the Kleene Closure  is a countable set, we can enumerate the strings in it as  etc. Then the Enumerator enumerating the language  will follow the steps:

 1 for i = 1,2,3,...
 2 Run  with input strings  for -steps
 3 If any string is accepted, then print it. 

Now the question comes whether every string in the language  will be printed by the Enumerator we constructed. For any string  in the language  the TM  will run finite number of steps(let it be  for ) to accept it. Then in the -th step of the Enumerator  will be printed. Thus the Enumerator will print every string  recognizes but a single string may be printed several times. 

An Enumerable Language is Turing Recognizable  

It's very easy to construct a Turing Machine  that recognizes the enumerable language . We can have two tapes. On one tape we take the input string and on the other tape, we run the enumerator to enumerate the strings in the language one after another. Once a string is printed in the second tape we compare it with the input in the first tape. If its a match, then we accept the input, else reject.

References 

 Computability theory
 Theory of computation